The Oxford Reference Guide to English Morphology is a 2013 book by Laurie Bauer, Rochelle Lieber and Ingo Plag in which the authors provide "a comprehensive reference volume covering the whole of contemporary English morphology".
In 2015 the authors were the recipients of the Linguistic Society of America's Leonard Bloomfield Book Award for writing the book.

References

2013 non-fiction books
Morphology books
Oxford University Press books
Books by Laurie Bauer
Leonard Bloomfield Book Award books